Ivan Serhiyovych Budnyak (born 17 January 1999) is a Ukrainian professional footballer who plays as a left winger for Polish club Narew Ostrołęka.

References

External links
 
 

1999 births
Living people
Footballers from Dnipro
Ukrainian footballers
Association football forwards
FC Dnipro players
FC VPK-Ahro Shevchenkivka players
FC Peremoha Dnipro players
Ukrainian First League players
Ukrainian Second League players